is a Japanese josei manga artist.

Career 
She made her professional debut in 1979 with Kyupiido Beibi ("Cupid Baby") in Seventeen. She was a steady writer for Young You magazine, until the magazine stopped publication. She is best known for her long-running series Papa Told Me about the daily life of a young girl and her widower father, for which she received the 1990 Shogakukan Manga Award for shōjo. Some of Haruno's 1990s manga, such as Pietà and Double House, have explored yuri and transgender themes.

Works

References

External links
 
 Profile at The Ultimate Manga Guide

Women manga artists
Manga artists from Fukushima Prefecture
Japanese female comics artists
Female comics writers
Living people
Hosei University alumni
20th-century Japanese women writers
20th-century Japanese writers
Year of birth missing (living people)